Unsinkable Sam (also known as Oskar or Oscar) is the nickname of a ship's cat who purportedly served during World War II with both the Kriegsmarine and the Royal Navy and survived the sinking of three ships.

History
The cat's original name is unknown.  The name "Oscar" was given by the crew of the  British destroyer HMS Cossack that rescued him from the sea  following the sinking of the German battleship  Bismarck.  "Oscar" was derived from the International Code of Signals for the letter 'O', which is code for "Man Overboard" (the German spelling, "Oskar", was sometimes used, since he was a German cat).

Bismarck

The black-and-white-patched cat was supposedly owned by an unknown crewman of the German battleship Bismarck and was on board the ship on 18 May 1941 when he set sail on Operation Rheinübung (German for  Rhine Exercise), Bismarcks only mission. Bismarck was sunk after a fierce naval battle on 27 May, and only 115 of her crew of over 2,100 survived the engagement. Hours later, Oscar was purportedly found floating on a board and picked from the water by the British destroyer HMS Cossack. Unaware of what his name had been on Bismarck, the crew of Cossack named their new mascot "Oscar".

HMS Cossack

The cat served on board Cossack for the next few months as the ship carried out convoy escort duties in the Mediterranean Sea and North Atlantic Ocean. Crew were transferred to the destroyer , and an attempt was made to tow the badly listing Cossack back to Gibraltar. However, worsening weather conditions meant the task became impossible and had to be abandoned. On 27 October, a day after the tow was slipped, Cossack sank to the west of Gibraltar. The initial explosion had blown off one third of the forward section of the ship, killing 159 of the crew; however, Oscar survived this, too, and was brought to the shore establishment in Gibraltar.

HMS Ark Royal

Now nicknamed "Unsinkable Sam", the cat was soon transferred to the aircraft carrier , which coincidentally had been instrumental in the destruction of Bismarck (along with Cossack). Attempts were also made to tow Ark Royal to Gibraltar, but the unstoppable inflow of water made the task futile. The carrier rolled over and sank 30 miles from Gibraltar. The slow rate at which the ship sank meant that all but one of the crew could be saved. The survivors, including Sam, who had been found clinging to a floating plank by a Motor Launch and described as "angry but quite unharmed", were transferred to HMS Lightning and the same HMS Legion which had rescued the crew of Cossack. Legion would itself be sunk in 1942, while the Lightning would be sunk in 1943.

The loss of Ark Royal proved the end of Sam's shipborne career. He was transferred first to the offices of the Governor of Gibraltar and then sent back to the United Kingdom, where he saw out the remainder of the war living in a seaman's home in Belfast called the "Home for Sailors". Sam died in 1955. A pastel portrait of Sam (titled Oscar, the Bismarck's Cat) by the artist Georgina Shaw-Baker (1860–1951)  is in the possession of the National Maritime Museum in Greenwich.

Historicity

Some authorities question whether Oscar/Sam's biography might be a "sea story", because – for example – there are pictures of two different cats identified as Oscar/Sam.

There is no mention of this incident in Ludovic Kennedy's detailed account of the sinking of the Bismarck, suggesting that information later gleaned from sailors regarding the cat's true service were apocryphal.  There were only a limited number of human survivors, as British ships had to abandon picking up survivors as there was believed to be a U-boat in the area.

See also
 List of individual cats

References

Further reading 
 
 

1955 animal deaths
German battleship Bismarck
Individual cats in the United Kingdom
Military animals of World War II